The 1970 Asbury Park race riots were a major civil disturbance that occurred in Asbury Park, New Jersey between July 4 and July 10, 1970. The seven days of rioting, looting, and destruction left more than 180 people injured, including 15 New Jersey state troopers, and resulted in an estimated $5,600,000 in damages.

Background 
According to Katrina Martin in an article for the David M. Rubenstein Rare Book & Manuscript Library at Duke University, "At the time of the riots, Asbury Park was a town of 17,000, 30% of which were African-American. The town’s population increased to 80,000 with summer vacationers. The Great Depression, followed by World War II, caused the resort industry in Asbury Park to change dramatically to keep up with the times.  The fancy resort stays gave way to weekend vacationers. The community maintained a steady resort community, but jobs at the resorts were frequently outsourced to white youth in the surrounding areas instead of local African American youth, which caused frustration in the community."A number of demands for youth programming by local African-American leaders had gone unmet by town leaders in the years leading up to the riots. As one blogger put it, "With the temperature in the high 90’s, no jobs, no hope for jobs, no recreation programs, and no real indication that city fathers were listening to their concerns – the west side youth were frustrated, angry and most likely feeling a sense of hopelessness."

Events 

The riots began on July 4, when African-American youth began breaking shop windows after a late dance at the West Side Community Center. By July 7, a list of twenty demands—including employment for black youth and appointment of black people on the Board of Education—was sent to the city by members of the black community.

Impacts 
The riots caused an estimated $4,000,000 in damage, plus an additional $1,600,000 of cleanup costs. In the aftermath of the riots, the governor of New Jersey asked President Nixon to declare the city a disaster area. Many West side residents were displaced from their homes, and the neighborhood continued to be impacted for a number of years after the riots ended.

The riots brought national attention to Asbury Park, New Jersey. The events received extensive coverage, not only in the local papers, but also in the New York Times and on the major television networks. However, they have received relatively little scholarly notice in the years following; in the words of historian Daniel Weeks,  "Some of the reasons for this neglect are obvious. Next to Los Angeles, Detroit, or Newark, where major “race riots” took place in the 1960s, Asbury Park is a small town. Then, too, in Asbury no one died, and historians, who are never immune to the culture in which they live, tend to measure the importance of civil unrest in terms of the death toll. But that is not to say what happened in Asbury is unimportant, particularly to the history of the city itself and to the history of New Jersey. Beyond these considerations, the events in Asbury Park should be remembered as part of what has been called the “Black Revolt” of the 1960s."

See also 

 Civil rights movement
 Mass racial violence in the United States
 List of incidents of civil unrest in the United States

References

1970 in New Jersey
African-American riots in the United States
Asbury Park, New Jersey
Urban decay in the United States
Riots and civil disorder in New Jersey